R711 road may refer to:
 R711 road (Ireland)
 R711 (South Africa)